Subbetica is a comarca in the province of Córdoba, Spain. It contains the following municipalities:
 
 Almedinilla
 Benamejí
 Cabra
 Carcabuey
 Doña Mencía
 Encinas Reales
 Fuente-Tójar
 Iznájar
 Lucena
 Luque
 Palenciana
 Priego de Córdoba
 Rute
 Zuheros

References 

Comarcas of Andalusia
Province of Córdoba (Spain)